Look Who's Back is a bestselling German satirical novel about Adolf Hitler by Timur Vermes, published in 2012 by . The novel was adapted into a German movie of the same name, which was released in 2015.

Plot
In 2011, Adolf Hitler wakes up in a vacant lot in Berlin which appears to be the location of the garden outside the bunker where he was burned, with no knowledge of anything that happened following his death in 1945. Homeless and destitute, he interprets everything he sees and experiences in 2011 from a Nazi perspective—for instance, he assumes that Turks in Germany are an indicator of Karl Dönitz having persuaded Turkey to join the Axis, and thinks that Wikipedia is named for Wikinger ("Vikings"). Although everyone recognizes him, nobody believes that he is Hitler; instead, they think he is either a comedian or a method actor. He appears on a variety television show called Whoa, dude!, going off-script to broadcast his views. Videos of his angry rants become hugely successful on YouTube, and he achieves modern celebrity status as a performer. The newspaper Bild tries to take him down, but is sued into praising him. He is beaten up by Neo-Nazis who think he is mocking the memory of Hitler, unaware that he is the genuine article. In the end, he uses his popularity to re-enter politics.

Publication
The book was priced at €19.33, a deliberate reference to Hitler's ascent to power in 1933. 
By March 2014 it had sold 1.4 million copies in Germany. The book has been translated into 41 languages. An English-language translation, Look Who's Back, translated by Jamie Bulloch, was published in April 2014 by MacLehose Press.

The original audiobook version is read by comedian Christoph Maria Herbst and by May 2014 had sold over 520,000 copies. Herbst had already played the Hitler-based character of Alfons Hatler in two comedy films, Der Wixxer (2004) and Neues vom Wixxer (2007), which landed him the part of reading the audio version of the book written from the first-person point of view of Hitler.

Film rights were sold, as were foreign license rights. As a part of the movie's promotion campaign, Masucci was made to appear as Hitler in several German cities, including the filming locations of Brandenburg and Berlin, testing the public's reactions, including at least one appearance close to an National Democratic Party of Germany rally.

Critical reception
In The Jewish Daily Forward, Gavriel Rosenfeld described the novel as "slapstick" but with a "moral message". However, while acknowledging that Vermes's portrayal of Hitler as human rather than monster is intended to better explain Germany's embrace of Nazism, Rosenfeld also states that the novel risks "glamorizing what it means to condemn": readers can "laugh not merely at Hitler, but also with him."

In , Cornelia Fiedler posited that the book's success may be due less to its literary merits and more to the fact that its protagonist is Hitler. She stated that focusing on Hitler, "either as a comic figure or as the incarnation of evil", risks obscuring the historical facts. Fiedler described Vermes's assumption that readers would agree that Hitler deserved mockery as "surprisingly naive".

In The Sydney Morning Herald, reviewer Jason Steger interviewed the book's author, who believes that the way Hitler is seen today "is one that hasn't too much to do with the real one". "Most people wouldn't think it possible that if they would have lived back then they would have thought he was in some way attractive too", he said.

References

External links

Interview in German with Timur Vermes, author of Er ist wieder da, on YouTube

2012 German novels
2012 science fiction novels
Novels about Adolf Hitler
German science fiction novels
German alternate history novels
German political novels
Satirical novels
Novels set in Berlin
German-language novels
Novels set in the 2010s
German novels adapted into films
Science fiction novels adapted into films
MacLehose Press books